Vsevolod Svyatoslavich, also known as Vsevolod Aurochs and Vsevolod the Fierce (died 1196), was a  Prince of Kursk and Prince of Trubchevsk from a Rurikid family in Kievan Rus. He participated in wars against Cumans and was mentioned in The Tale of Igor's Campaign.

Rurik dynasty
Medieval Russian people
1196 deaths
Eastern Orthodox monarchs
Year of birth unknown
12th-century princes in Kievan Rus'